Wallen Mapondera (born 27 December 1985 in Harare, Zimbabwe) is a Zimbabwean visual artist, known for work that explores social mores and societal relationships using livestock imagery. His work has been displayed in Australia, Germany, the Netherlands, South Africa, Spain and the United States.

Education  
2005–2007, National Gallery of Zimbabwe Visual Arts Studios, formerly B.A.T.

Recognition
 2018, Pro Helvetia 2018 studio artist in residency, Johannesburg, South Africa
 2016, African Centre Artist in Residency, Tafaria castle, Tafaria, Kenya
 2016, Guns and Rain first artist in residency, Johannesburg, South Africa
 2015, Winner in Visual Arts, National Arts Merit Award
 2015, Artist in residency, National Art Gallery of Zimbabwe, Harare, Zimbabwe.
 2012, 1st Prize in Illustration and Graphics, Family, Tradition and Religion, an art exhibition and competition sponsored by the European Union, Gallery Delta, Harare
 2012, 2nd Prize in Multi-media, Family, Tradition and Religion sponsored by the European Union, Gallery Delta, Harare
 2012, Artist in residency, Vermont Studio Center, Burlington, Vermont, USA.
 2010, 1st Prize in Illustration and Graphics, FACET Zimbabwe Now, sponsored by the German Embassy, Gallery Delta, Harare
 2010, Special Mention in Multi-media, FACET Zimbabwe Now, sponsored by the German Embassy, Gallery Delta, Harare
 2010, nominee, National Arts Merit Awards (NAMA)
 2010, Illustration, Artists in Stream Exhibition, Gallery Delta, Harare
 2009, Overall award, F.A.C.T COTCO Exhibition, National Gallery of Zimbabwe, Harare, Zimbabwe
 2009, 2nd prize, Unity, Exhibition, Gallery Delta, Harare, Zimbabwe
 2008, Award of Merit, Enriching Woman Exhibition, Gallery Delta, Harare, Zimbabwe.
 2008, Award of Merit, Post Election Selection Exhibition, Gallery Delta, Harare, Zimbabwe
 2008, 2nd Prize, The Young Artist Exhibition, Gallery Delta, Harare, Zimbabwe
 2007, Award of Merit, Enriching Woman Exhibition, Gallery Delta, Harare, Zimbabwe

Exhibitions

Solo
 2018, Solo Exhibition, SMAC Gallery, Johannesburg, South Africa.
 2017, Tsananguro | Clarifications, SMAC Gallery, Cape Town, South Africa.
 2016, Paint My Tea Pot, Tafaria Castle, Tafaria, Kenya.
 2014, SOCIAL ZOOMETRY, Gallery Delta, Harare, Zimbabwe
 2013, ANI-MAN—a human in an animal, Association for Visual Arts Gallery, Cape Town, South Africa
 2012, TURNING TABLES, Red Mill Gallery, Vermont Studio Center, U.S.A
 2009. X MARKS THE SPOT, Trueworths Gallery, Cape Town, South Africa
 2007, MAZUVA OSE, the National Gallery of Zimbabwe End of Residency program, Harare

Group exhibitions
 2017, 1:54 Contemporary African Art Fair (SMAC Gallery), London, UK.
 2017, FNB Joburg Art Fair (SMAC Gallery), Sandton Convention Centre, Johannesburg, South Africa.
 2016, Turbine Art Fair (TAF), Johannesburg, South Africa.
 2016, Nothing Personal, SMAC Gallery, Stellenbosch, South Africa.
 2016, Suddenly A Dissident (Two Man Show), Point of Order Gallery, Johannesburg, South Africa.
 2015, Turbine Art Fair (TAF), Johannesburg, South Africa.
 2015, 1:54 Contemporary African Art Fair, London, UK.
 2014, Umoji, KooVha Gallery
 2014, Collectors Cocktail, KooVha Gallery
 2014, Truth and Disorder, KooVha Gallery
 2012, Thupelo Workshop Exhibition, Greatmore Studios, Cape Town, South Africa
 2012, Between the Sheets, Gallery East, North Fremantle, Western Australia.
 2011, Colour Africa, Munich, Germany
 2010, Live ‘n’ Direct, National Gallery of Zimbabwe sponsored by Culture Fund and Kingdom Bank, Harare
 2010, African Expressions, DeAvignon University, France
 2009, F.A.C.T COTCO, National Gallery of Zimbabwe sponsored by the Cotton Company of Zimbabwe, Harare
 2009, Ani-mal Exhibition, VEO Gallery, Cape Town, South Africa
 2008, COTTCO Exhibition, An art exhibition and competition sponsored by the cotton company of Zimbabwe, National Gallery of Zimbabwe, Harare
 2008 The Young Artist Exhibition and Competition, Gallery Delta sponsored by HIVOS Foundation, Harare
 2008 Salon 91 Art Exhibition, Salon 91, Cape Town, South Africa

References

External links
 "Wallen Mapondera", at Africa First.

1985 births
Living people
Zimbabwean artists
Zimbabwean illustrators